The 2013 Korean Grand Prix (formally known as the 2013 Formula 1 Korean Grand Prix) was a Formula One motor race that was held on 6 October 2013 at the Korea International Circuit in Yeongam, South Korea. The race was the fourteenth round of the 2013 season, and marked the fourth and final running of the Korean Grand Prix.

The race which was contested over 55 laps was won by Sebastian Vettel, driving for Red Bull Racing. He dominantly won the race to claim his fourth consecutive victory of the year. He achieved a Grand Slam for the second race in a row, becoming the first driver since Jim Clark in 1963 to achieve the feat in consecutive race weekends.

The result meant that Vettel extended his lead to 77 points over Alonso and could seal his fourth consecutive championship in the next race in Japan if results went his way. Räikkönen leapfrogged Hamilton to go third, 28 points behind Alonso while Hamilton's result meant he was six points behind Räikkönen's score. Behind them, Mark Webber, who retired after a fire due to a collision with Adrian Sutil, kept fifth while Rosberg also stayed in sixth. On lap 38 a fire truck appeared on track on its driver's own accord during a safety car period after Webber's car caught fire.

Despite major circuit renovations including a complete modification to the exit of the pit lane, this was the last Korean Grand Prix in Formula One to date.

Classification

Qualifying

Notes:
 — Mark Webber received a ten-place grid penalty after receiving his 3rd reprimand of the season, for hitching a ride back to the pits on Fernando Alonso's Ferrari at the previous race.

 — Jules Bianchi received a three-place grid penalty and a reprimand after impeding Paul di Resta while on an out-lap.

Race

Notes
 — Jean-Éric Vergne, Daniel Ricciardo and Adrian Sutil failed to finish the race but were classified as they completed over 90% of the race.
This was the last Korean GP. The race was on the 2014 provisional calendar, scheduled for 25–27 April, but the Jeolla government cut funding to the circuit. Another reason was the very low number of spectators because the circuit was about 400 km from Seoul, the capital of South Korea.

Championship standings after the race

Drivers' Championship standings 

Constructors' Championship standings

 Note: Only the top five positions are included for both sets of standings.
 Bold text shows drivers or teams that still had a mathematical chance of winning the championship.

References

External links

Korean
Grand Prix
Korean Grand Prix
Korean Grand Prix